In cryptovirology, a goat file is a sacrificial program file used in computer virus testing, and contains a copy of a known computer virus which will be released and injected into the machine's memory when the file is executed.

Etymology
Goat files are so named for their similar use to the sacrifice of a goat in antiquity - the file is lost in order for the virus to be studied, but it is considered a minimal loss as more goat files can easily be assimilated.

References

Computer viruses